The 2020–21 Oman Professional League was the 45th edition of the Oman Professional League, the top football league in Oman. The season was cancelled after 10 matches due COVID-19 pandemic.

Team

References

Top level Omani football league seasons
2020–21 in Omani football
Oman
Oman Professional League, 2020-21